El Vigilante is an outdoor cire perdue bronze sculpture installed along Mexican Federal Highway 85D ("México–Pachuca" Highway), in the limits of Ecatepec de Morelos and Tlalnepantla de Baz, in the State of Mexico.

Description and history 
The sculpture was designed by Jorge Marín and it was inaugurated on 18 March 2016 by Enrique Peña Nieto, the president of Mexico from 2012 to 2018 during the inauguration of the adjacent vehicular bridge. Even though its basement also functions as an observation deck, as of January 2020 there were no bridges or access roads that directly connect to it. The sculpture weighs .

Marín said he designed the sculpture in a contemporary manner, featuring a young man with tattoos and piercings that wears a bird mask to represent Ehecatl, a deity associated with the wind. Marín recommended looking at it in a quick and distant way. The sculpture cost over seven million Mexican pesos.

See also
 El Ángel de la Seguridad Social, a similar sculpture by Marín

References

External links

2016 establishments in Mexico
2016 sculptures
Bronze sculptures in Mexico
Ecatepec de Morelos
Outdoor sculptures in the State of Mexico
Sculptures of angels
Statues in Mexico